Electoral district no. 6 was one of the multi-member electoral districts of the Riigikogu, the national legislature of Estonia. The district was established in 1995 following the re-organisation of electoral districts. It was abolished in 2003. It was conterminous with the counties of Ida-Viru and Lääne-Viru.

Election results

Detailed

1999
Results of the 1999 parliamentary election held on 7 March 1999:

The following candidates were elected:
 Personal mandates - Edgar Savisaar (K), 14,320 votes.
 District mandates - Viktor Andrejev (EÜRP), 3,710 votes; Tunne-Väldo Kelam (I), 4,283 votes; Urmas Laht (K), 840 votes; Kristiina Ojuland (RE), 3,112 votes; Endel Paap (EÜRP), 2,530 votes; Raivo Paavo (M), 2,861 votes; Mihhail Stalnuhhin (K), 2,570 votes; and Toomas Varek (K), 1,115 votes.
 Compensatory mandates - Arvo Jaakson (K), 218 votes; and Tõnu Kõiv (M), 163 votes.

1995
Results of the 1995 parliamentary election held on 5 March 1995:

The following candidates were elected:
 Personal mandates - Juhan Aare (KMÜ), 8,433 votes; and Edgar Savisaar (K), 13,699 votes.
 District mandates - Kaljo Kiisk (RE), 4,437 votes; Ando Leps (KMÜ), 1,630 votes; and Harald Mägi (KMÜ), 1,754 votes.
 Compensatory mandates - Viktor Andrejev (MKOE), 3,362 votes; Vambo Kaal (M), 1,949 votes; Kristiina Ojuland (RE), 492 votes; and Feliks Undusk (RE), 1,359 votes.

References

06
Ida-Viru County
Lääne-Viru County
06
06